DR Y.S.R University of Health Sciences; DR.YSRUHS: Ḍā. En. Ṭī. Ār. Ārogyașāstra Vișvavidyālayamu)is a public university in the city of Vijayawada, Andhra Pradesh,

History
The university was established as University of Health Sciences by the Government of Andhra Pradesh and was inaugurated on 9 April by N. T. Rama Rao, the then-Chief Minister of the state. It started functioning on 1 November 1986 with Rama Rao as the university's first chancellor. Following the death of Rama Rao, a directive was issued by the Government of Andhra Pradesh to rename the university "Dr. NTR University of Health Sciences", carried out on 2 February 1998. The university celebrated its silver jubilee from 1–3 November 2011. The University has been renamed as Dr. YSR University of Health Sciences in September 2022.

Facilities
There is a library and computer center where the library network is operated from. A guest house is available with different categories of accommodation for the faculty, examiners and visitors. The examinations section is housed in a separate area where special security electronically controls access, which can only be gained by authorised staff and security officers. A biometric-based electronic attendance system has also been institutionally implemented.

Admission and courses
The admission for the convener quota is based on applicant's EAMCET rank for other allied paramedics and pharma courses and NEET (National Eligibility Entrance Test ) rank for admission into MBBS and BDS Courses.

The university has graduate and postgraduate degrees, diploma and super-specialty courses in modern medicine; graduate and postgraduate degree courses in dental surgery, nursing, Ayurveda, homeopathy, and Unani; graduate degree courses in naturopathy, physiotherapy and medical laboratory technology, as well as a postgraduate course (M.Sc.) in applied nutrition.

The number of colleges affiliated to the university since its establishment has risen from twenty-seven to 184. The degrees awarded by the university are recognized by professional statutory bodies, including the Medical Council of India, the Dental Council of India, the Central Council of Indian Medicine, the Central Council of Homoeopathy and the Indian Nursing Council.

Affiliated colleges and Institutes

Government colleges

 Andhra Medical College, Visakhapatnam
 Sri Venkateswara Medical College, Tirupati
 Government Medical College, Srikakulam
 Government Medical College, Anantapur
 Guntur Medical College, Guntur
 Kurnool Medical College, Kurnool
 Government Medical College, Ongole
 Government Medical College, Kadapa
 Rangaraya Medical College, Kakinada
 Siddhartha Medical College, Vijayawada
 A. C. Subba Reddy Government Medical College, Nellore
Sri Padmavathi medical college, Tirupati
Sri Venkateswara institute of medical sciences, Tirupati

Private colleges

 Alluri Sitarama Raju Academy of Medical Sciences, Eluru
 Apollo Institute of Medical sciences and Research , Murukambattu, Chittoor
 Fatima Institute of Medical Sciences, Kadapa
 Gayatri Vidya Parishad Institute of Health Care and Medical Technology, Visakhapatnam
 G.S.L. Medical College, Rajamahendravaram
 Great Eastern Medical School and Hospital, Srikakulam
 Katuri Medical College and Hospital, Guntur
 Konaseema Institute of Medical Sciences and Research Foundation, Amalapuram
 Maharaja Institute of Medical Sciences, Vizianagaram
 Narayana College of Nursing, Nellore 
 Narayana Medical College, Nellore    
 Nimra Institute of Medical Sciences, Ibrahimpatnam, Krishna district
 NRI Institute of Medical Sciences, Visakhapatnam
 NRI Medical College, Guntur
 P. B. Siddhartha College of Arts and Science, Vijayawada
 P.E.S. Institute of Medical Sciences and Research, Kuppam
 Dr. Pinnammaneni Siddhartha Institute of Medical Sciences and Research Foundation, Vijayawada
 Santhi Ram Medical College, Nandyal
 Viswabharathi Medical College, Kurnool
 Sri Balaji Medical College, Renugunta

Publications
The university publishes the quarterly multi-disciplinary Journal of Dr. NTR University of Health Sciences, available both as a free, open-access journal online as well as in print. The first issue was published on 21 March 2012.

Vice-chancellors
 K. N. Rao (1986–1988) 
 L. Suryanarayana (1988–1994) 
 C. S. Bhaskaran (1994–1997) 
 G. Shamsunder (1997–2004) 
 R. Sambasiva Rao (2004–2007) 
 P. V. Ramesh (2007–2007) 
 A. V. Krishnam Raju (2007–2010)
 I. V. Rao (2010–2014)
 T. Ravi Raju (2014–2017)
 C. V. Rao (2017–2019)
 Pigilam Syama Prasad (2020–)

References

External links
 

Medical and health sciences universities in India
Universities and colleges in Vijayawada
Educational institutions established in 1986
1986 establishments in Andhra Pradesh
Memorials to NT Rama Rao
State universities in Andhra Pradesh